Nawaf Abdullah Ghayyath Shukrallah (born 13 October 1976) is a Bahraini football referee who has been a full international referee for FIFA.

In 2011, FIFA called him on duty at the 2011 FIFA U-17 World Cup.

He has also officiated at other tournaments, including the AFC Champions League, the 2012 FIFA Club World Cup, and 2014 FIFA World Cup qualifiers.

In March 2013, FIFA named Shukrallah to its list of 52 candidate referees for the 2014 FIFA World Cup in Brazil.

Nawaf has officiated in the 2014 and 2018 FIFA World Cups.

References 

1976 births
Living people
Bahraini football referees
2014 FIFA World Cup referees
FIFA World Cup referees
2018 FIFA World Cup referees
AFC Asian Cup referees